The 2014–15 Lebanese Women's Football League was the 8th edition of the Lebanese Women's Football League since its inception in 2008. SAS won their first title, beating GFA in the final.

League table

See also
2014–15 Lebanese Women's FA Cup

References

External links
RSSSF.com

Lebanese Women's Football League seasons
W1
2014–15 domestic women's association football leagues